Man vs Beast is the sixth novel of the CHERUB series by Robert Muchamore.

Plot
A 14-year-old boy called Andy Pierce witnesses his mother, Christine, getting assaulted by two masked men working for the Animal Freedom Militia.

On CHERUB campus, Kerry is annoyed with her boyfriend, James. James goes into his room and is met by his sister, Lauren, who asks him to help her and her best friend Bethany to sneak into the basic training compound to give Bethany's brother, Jake, and Lauren's crush, Rat, some supplies. James refuses, but Lauren blackmails him by threatening to tell Kerry about him cheating on her during a mission the previous year.

James joins Lauren and Bethany on the mission to get the food to the trainees. They successfully deliver the supplies, but upon returning to his room, James gets a call from CHERUB chairman Mac, who had earlier found out about the mission, then watched it unfold on the backup CCTV system. After Mac reveals a photocopy of Lauren's master plan, including her intention to blackmail James, James avoids punishment; Lauren and Bethany, however, are punished. Lauren and Kyle are punished with having to dig out the campus ditches.

Three weeks later, James, Lauren, and Kyle are sent on a mission, with Zara as mission controller, to bring down the AFM (Animal Freedom Militia), an animal liberation terrorist group. They stay with peaceful animal liberationist Ryan Quinn, with Zara posing as his fiancée. Kyle and James befriend suspected members of AFM, and are eventually invited on a top-secret mission with the group. Meanwhile, Lauren is stuck with the Ryan, while Zara is in a meeting in London. Ryan gets invited to rescue dozens of beagle puppies that were going to be sold onto the testing company; with Zara away, Lauren joins him. The rescue is a success, but the rescuers were overwhelmed, as many more dogs were rescued than they thought. When Zara arrives after all the puppies have been taken away, Lauren saves one puppy (who had escaped) after it nearly runs under Zara's car. She brings him back to Ryan's house, and names him Meatball.

James and Kyle successfully infiltrate the AFA (Animal Freedom Army), another movement within the AFM, and find themselves part of a stunt being broadcast live. James and two members of the AFA kidnap Nick Cobb, a TV chef, from the set of a daytime chat show, and take him to a farm in Northern England. Nick Cobb is locked in a cage, and James and the two AFA members head to a safe house. The AFA start a live broadcast over the internet, which is picked up by multiple news channels, where AFA members Jo and Viv describes the poor treatment of animals by Nick Cobb's company's legal team. Cobb is revealed, locked in a cage, and fed cleaning chemicals through a tube. At the safe house, James overpowers the other two AFA members and drives back to CHERUB campus. After the anti-terrorist unit cut off the broadcast, Kyle manages to overpower the AFA members at the farm and get them to load Nick Cobb into a van, which Kyle drives to the hospital. Several members of the AFA were subsequently arrested and imprisoned.

Zara and Lauren leave Ryan's house and head back to campus, taking Meatball with them. Active agents aren't allowed pets, but Zara and Ewart Asker take up Lauren's offer to adopt him after they stop off at the Askers' house on the way back to campus.

Two days later, most CHERUB agents are aboard a flight about to depart to the CHERUB summer hostel on a Mediterranean island, and it is revealed that Zara Asker has been appointed chairwoman of CHERUB.

Reception
The book has been thoroughly recommended by The Sunday Telegraph.

References

CHERUB novels
2006 British novels
Hodder & Stoughton books